Mary Ramsey (born December 24, 1963) is a member of folk rock duo John & Mary and lead singer and violinist for the American alternative rock band 10,000 Maniacs. Ramsey has also worked with other well-known artists such as Jackson Browne, Goo Goo Dolls, Billy Bragg, Warren Zevon, Alex Chilton and Ani DiFranco.

Biography 

Ramsey is a classically trained violinist who has been playing the violin since age five. She has worked with the Erie Philharmonic and was a founder of the Lexington String Trio. She has also performed with the Fresno Philharmonic, the Santa Cruz Symphony and the Monterey Symphony in California and is currently a member of the Western New York Chamber Orchestra.

With John Lombardo, former member of 10,000 Maniacs, Ramsey formed the folk rock duo John & Mary in 1989. The pair made two recordings under the name John & Mary, Victory Gardens in 1991 and The Weedkiller's Daughter in 1993. Both albums were released on Rykodisc and are out of print. Mary Ramsey also played violin and viola for 10,000 Maniacs and sang backing vocals on the 1993 album MTV Unplugged.

Ramsey returned to the Maniacs as lead singer and songwriter in 1995 after Natalie Merchant's departure, along with Lombardo. The duo released two albums with the Maniacs, 1997's Love Among the Ruins, which contained a cover of the Roxy Music song "More Than This" that became a top 40 hit on the U.S. charts, and The Earth Pressed Flat in 1999. While with 10,000 Maniacs, Ramsey toured throughout the U.S. and in Brazil, Puerto Rico, Panama, England, Portugal, Germany, the Netherlands and Austria. The band also played USO shows in Kuwait and Bahrain. One of the highlights of her career was a performance at the inaugural ball for Bill Clinton's second term as president.

In 2002, after she and Lombardo both left the Maniacs following the death of guitarist Rob Buck, John & Mary released The Pinwheel Galaxy (2003).  With their current band the Valkyries, they released Peace Bridge (2007).

Ramsey was rehired by 10,000 Maniacs as a viola player and backing vocalist for the 2006 shows with Oskar Saville and returned to the lead vocalist spot after the departure of Saville in 2007. She has continued as lead vocalist ever since and performed on both the band's 30th anniversary tour (2011–13) and 40th anniversary tour (2021–22), as well as the studio albums Music from the Motion Picture (2013) and Twice Told Tales (2015), which featured Lombardo's return as well, and the live album Playing Favorites (2016).

Other projects 
Ramsey has performed with a group of friends under the name Mary Ramsey and the Healers.  Other members include Sandra Williams Gordon on percussion, Craig Gordon on bass and acoustic guitars, Dr. Marc Rosen on electric guitar, and Ben Clarke on lead guitar and bass. In another project, she was joined by fellow Buffalonians Theresa Quinn, Susan Rozler, and Alison Pipitone in a group called Girls Gone Mild. Ramsey has also worked as a performer and music director for the Irish Classical Theater in Buffalo, New York. She teaches private lessons in violin, viola, voice and piano.

Discography

With John & Mary
Victory Gardens (1991)
The Weedkiller's Daughter (1993)
The Pinwheel Galaxy (2002)

With John & Mary & the Valkyries
Peace Bridge (2007)

With 10,000 Maniacs
Love Among the Ruins (1997)
The Earth Pressed Flat (1999)
Triangles (EP) (2011)
Music from the Motion Picture (2013)
Twice Told Tales (2015)
For Crying Out Loud (EP) (2016)
Playing Favorites (2016)
Live at the Belly Up (2017)

Other credits 
Don't Try This at Home (1991) – with Billy Bragg (violin, viola)
Our Time in Eden (1992) – with 10,000 Maniacs (violin, viola)
Imperfectly (1992) – with Ani Difranco (viola)
Candy Everybody Wants (EP) (1992) - with 10,000 Maniacs (violin, viola)
MTV Unplugged (1993) – with 10,000 Maniacs (viola, background vocals)
Puddle Dive (1993) – with Ani Difranco (violin)
Superstar Car Wash (1993) – with Goo Goo Dolls
Between Us (1998) – with Jules Shear (vocals, viola, fiddle)
Coming of Age (2002) – with Jude Johnstone (viola)
Songs for the Uninvited (2002) – with Zoomer (electric violin, viola)
Heads or Tales (2003)  - with Jamie Notarthomas (violin)
Campfire Songs: The Popular, Obscure and Unknown Recordings (2004) - with 10,000 Maniacs (background vocals, violin, viola)
On a Good Day (2005) – with Jude Johnstone (viola)
Take My Life (2005)  - with Scott Underwood (viola)
Live Twenty-Five (2006) – with 10,000 Maniacs (electric violin)
Billy Bragg, Vol. 2 (2006) - with Billy Bragg (violin)
Innocent Bystanders (2007) – with Innocent Bystanders (strings)
Extended Versions (2009) – with 10,000 Maniacs (lead vocals, viola)
Machines of Love and War (2009) - with The Dreaming (violin, viola)
Me and Miss Grimes (2009) - with Alison Pipitone Band (violin)
Quiet Girl (2011) – with Jude Johnstone (viola)
Big Wide World (2013) - with Alison Pipitone Band (violin)

References

External links 
 
 
 John and Mary and the Valkyries MySpace
 Mary Ramsey and the Healers Facebook page
 

1963 births
Living people
10,000 Maniacs members
John & Mary members
American women singer-songwriters
American women pop singers
American folk singers
American women rock singers
American folk rock musicians
American rock songwriters
Singer-songwriters from New York (state)
Musicians from Buffalo, New York